Scleropages jardinii, the Gulf saratoga, Australian bonytongue , Pearl arowana or northern saratoga, is a freshwater bony fish native to Australia and New Guinea, one of two species of fishes sometimes known as Australian arowana, the other being Scleropages leichardti. It has numerous other common names, including northern saratoga, toga and barramundi (not to be confused with the barramundi perch, Lates calcarifer). It is a member of the subfamily Osteoglossinae, a (basal) teleost group. Its scientific name is sometimes spelled S. jardini.

Distribution
Scleropages jardinii is patchily distributed throughout most of the Gulf of Carpentaria drainage system, west to the Adelaide River in the Northern Territory, throughout northern Queensland and in central-southern New Guinea. It inhabits still clear waters of pools and billabongs, and the slow-flowing sections of streams.

It is not considered endangered or threatened by either the CITES conventions nor the IUCN Red List.

Description
This fish has a long, dark-colored body with seven rows of large scales, each with several reddish or pinkish spots arranged in a crescent shape around the trailing edge of the scale, giving it a pearly appearance. It has large, wing-like pectoral fins. Except for duller coloration and smaller scale size, it appears very similar to the Asian arowana, S. formosus. The depth of the bodies of adults is approximately 25-28% of the Standard Length, making this a more robust fish than its Australian cousin S. leichardti.

Like other arowanas, it is a mouthbrooder, but unlike the Asian arowana, reports suggest the female rather than the male broods the young in her mouth.

Due to their resemblance to the Asian arowanas they are sometimes sold in the name of golden arowana in some of the Asian countries, like India. However, they can be easily distinguished from the Asian arowanas by identifying their red spotted fins & 7-8 rows of scales on their body.

Diet
Gulf saratoga are opportunistic carnivores, feeding on aquatic and terrestrial insects, small fishes and crustaceans.

See also
List of freshwater aquarium fish species

References

 
 
 Dawes, John; Chuan, Lim Lian; & Cheong, Leslie, eds (1999). Dragon Fish, The. Kingdom Books England.

External links
 Fishes of Australia website
 Native Fish Australia article

Scleropages
Freshwater fish of Australia
Fish described in 1892
Taxa named by William Saville-Kent